Moara Vlăsiei is a commune in the northern part of Ilfov County, Muntenia, Romania. Its name means "Mill of Wallachia[n forest]", and was called Căciulați until 1968, when its administrative center was moved from the village of Căciulați to Moara Vlăsiei (a village previously named Moara Săracă the Poor Mill). It is composed of two villages, Căciulați and Moara Vlăsiei.

The village is home to Moara Vlăsiei Cricket Ground, the only cricket field in Romania.

References

Communes in Ilfov County
Localities in Muntenia